Tell Kabb Elias is an archaeological site 3 km southwest of Chtaura in the Beqaa Mohafazat (Governorate). It dates at least to the Neolithic.

References

Baalbek District
Bronze Age sites in Lebanon